Persatuan Sepakbola Malaka or simply PS Malaka is an  Indonesian football club based in Malaka, East Nusa Tenggara. They currently play in Liga 3 and their homeground is Betun Field.

References

External links

Football clubs in Indonesia
Association football clubs established in 2015